Jilarata is a  mountain in the Andes of Bolivia. It is located in the Oruro Department, Ladislao Cabrera Province, Salinas de Garci Mendoza Municipality. It lies near the Uyuni salt flat, north of Tunupa.

References 

Mountains of Oruro Department